Chrysochou is a village in the Paphos District of Cyprus, located 3 km south of Polis Chrysochous.

References

Communities in Paphos District